Cominotto, sometimes referred to as Cominetto, is an uninhabited Mediterranean island off the northern coast of Malta. Measuring only  in area, it is the largest uninhabited island of Malta.

Between Comino and Cominotto lie the transparent, cyan waters of the Blue Lagoon (Maltese: Bejn il-Kmiemen, literally "Between the Cominos"). Frequented by large numbers of tourists and tour boats daily, the Blue Lagoon makes it popular with divers and snorkelers.

References

Islands of Malta
Uninhabited islands of Malta
Comino